The boreal forest or taiga of the North American continent stretches through a majority of Canada and most of central Alaska, extending spottily into the beginning of the Rocky Mountain range in Northern Montana and into New England and the Adirondack Mountains of New York. This habitat extends as far north as the tree line (replaced by the High Arctic tundra) and discontinues in mixed deciduous-coniferous forests to the south. The "taiga", as it is called there, of Eurasia occupies a similar range on those continents. Throughout the Northern Hemisphere, the boreal forest covers 2.3 million square miles, a larger area than the remaining Brazilian Amazon rain forest. Although it is largely forest, the boreal forests include a network of lakes, river valleys, wetlands, peat lands and semi-open tundra.

Only 8% of the Canadian boreal forest is protected and over 30% has already been designated for logging, energy and other development, much of it within the last decade. The U.S. is the leading importer of Canadian wood products as well as oil and gas, having purchased 20 billion dollars (approximately 80% of Canada's timber exports) worth of Canadian forest products in 2001. Presently trees being logged in the Boreal are primarily pulped and turned into disposable products such as toilet tissue, junk mail, and catalogs. Decisions will be made in the next several years regarding the remaining lands and where development will take place.

Historically, this wilderness has long remained vast and little-known to birding and naturalist groups, who have placed their attentions southwards. Although, the wintering grounds of many North American migratory birds also requires attention, now it has become apparent that our attention must be focused north on the Boreal breeding grounds of many of these birds. It is estimated that about 60% of the American bird population found North of the Mexican border nests in the boreal forest. About half of North America's breeding species (over 300) make their home there. The following is a list of the North American birds reliant on the boreal forests.

Birds almost totally dependent on the boreal forests
The following is a list (taxonomically organized) of the breeding species of which at least 70% of their North American population rely upon the boreal forest for nesting. If the boreal forests were cleared, these species would almost surely perish or be endangered.

Surf scoter, Melanitta perspicillata
White-winged scoter, Melanitta deglandi
Black scoter, Melanitta americana
Bufflehead, Bucephala albeola
Common goldeneye, Bucephala clangula
Spruce grouse, Falcipennis canadensis
Common loon, Gavia immer
Horned grebe, Podiceps auritus
Red-necked grebe, Podiceps grisegena
Whooping crane, Grus americana
Greater yellowlegs, Tringa melanoleuca

Lesser yellowlegs, Tringa flavipes
Solitary sandpiper, Tringa solitaria
Wandering tattler, Tringa incana
Spotted sandpiper, Actitis macularius
Whimbrel, Numenius phaeopus
Surfbird, Aphriza virgata
Short-billed dowitcher Limnodromus griseus
Common black-headed gull, Chroicocephalus ridibundus

Bonaparte's gull, Chroicocephalus philadelphia
Herring gull, Larus argentatus
Great black-backed gull, Larus marinus
Common tern, Sterna hirundo
Northern hawk owl, Surnia ulula
Great gray owl, Strix nebulosa
Boreal owl, Aegolius funereus
American three-toed woodpecker, Picoides dorsalis
Black-backed woodpecker, Picoides arcticus

Yellow-bellied flycatcher, Empidonax flaviventris
Alder flycatcher, Empidonax alnorum
Northern shrike, Lanius excubitor
Philadelphia vireo, Vireo philadelphicus
Canada jay, Perisoreus canadensis
Boreal chickadee, Poecile hudsonica
Ruby-crowned kinglet, Regulus calendula
Gray-cheeked thrush, Catharus minimus
Bicknell's thrush, Catharus bicknelli
Swainson's thrush, Catharus ustulatus
Hermit thrush, Catharus guttatus

Bohemian waxwing, Bombycilla garrulus
Tennessee warbler, Oreothlypis peregrina
Magnolia warbler, Setophaga magnolia
Cape May warbler, Setophaga tigrina
Yellow-rumped warbler, Setophaga coronata
Kirtland's warbler, Setophaga kirtlandii
Palm warbler, Setophaga palmarum
Bay-breasted warbler, Setophaga castanea
Blackpoll warbler, Setophaga striata
Northern waterthrush, Parkesia noveboracensis
Connecticut warbler, Oporornis agilis
Mourning warbler, Geothlypis philadelphia

Le Conte's sparrow, Ammodramus leconteii
Lincoln's sparrow, Melospiza lincolnii
Swamp sparrow, Melospiza georgiana
White-throated sparrow, Zonotrichia albicollis
Dark-eyed junco, Junco hyemalis
Rusty blackbird, Euphagus carolinus
Pine grosbeak, Pinicola enucleator
Red crossbill, Loxia curvirostra
White-winged crossbill, Loxia leucoptera
Common redpoll, Acanthis flammea

Birds that are very dependent on the boreal forests
These are birds that more than half of the North American populations nest in the boreal forest. Many of these birds need mature forests or isolated, non-populated wetlands that now have been largely cleared outside of the boreal forests.

Trumpeter swan, Cygnus buccinator
American wigeon, Anas americana
American black duck, Anas rubripes
Green-winged teal, Anas crecca
Ring-necked duck, Aythya collaris
Greater scaup, Aythya marila
Lesser scaup, Aythya affinis
Barrow's goldeneye, Bucephala islandica
Hooded merganser, Lophodytes cucullatus
Common merganser, Mergus merganser

Ruffed grouse, Bonasa umbellus
White-tailed ptarmigan, Lagopus leucura
Pacific loon, Gavia pacifica
Northern goshawk, Accipiter gentilis
Merlin, Falco columbarius
Yellow rail, Coturnicops noveboracensis
Sora, Porzana carolina
Semipalmated plover, Charadrius semipalmatus
Hudsonian godwit, Limosa haemastica
Pectoral sandpiper, Calidris melanotos
White-rumped sandpiper, Calidris fuscicollis
Least sandpiper, Calidris minutilla
Common snipe, Gallinago gallinago

Red-necked phalarope, Phalaropus lobatus
Mew gull, Larus canus
Ross's gull, Rhodostethia rosea
Arctic tern, Sterna paradisaea
Yellow-bellied sapsucker, Sphyrapicus varius
Olive-sided flycatcher, Contopus cooperi
Least flycatcher, Empidonax minimus
Blue-headed vireo, Vireo solitarius
Northern wheatear, Oenanthe oenanthe
Orange-crowned warbler, Oreothlypis celata
Nashville warbler, Oreothlypis ruficapilla
Chestnut-sided warbler, Setophaga pensylvanica
Black-throated green warbler, Setophaga virens

Blackburnian warbler, Setophaga fusca
Black-and-white warbler, Mniotilta varia
Ovenbird, Seiurus aurocapilla
Wilson's warbler, Cardellina pusilla
Canada warbler, Cardellina canadensis
Clay-colored sparrow, Spizella pallida
American tree sparrow, Spizelloides arborea
Fox sparrow Passerella iliaca
White-crowned sparrow, Zonotrichia leucophrys
Golden-crowned sparrow, Zonotrichia atricapilla
Gray-crowned rosy-finch, Leucosticte tephrocotis

Birds that are partially dependent on the boreal forests
Although less than half of the following birds' North American populations nest in the boreal forests, a major portion of their species is reliant on this habitat. Many of these birds are more often aquatic and woodland generalist than species more dependent on the taiga.
Greater white-fronted goose Anser albifrons
Snow goose Chen caerulescens
Canada goose Branta canadensis

Mallard, Anas platyrhynchos
Northern shoveler, Anas clypeata
Northern pintail, Anas acuta
Canvasback, Aythya valisineria
Harlequin duck, Histrionicus histrionicus
Common eider, Somateria mollissima
Long-tailed duck, Clangula hyemalis
Red-breasted merganser, Mergus serrator
Willow ptarmigan, Lagopus lagopus
Rock ptarmigan, Lagopus muta
Arctic loon, Gavia arctica
Red-throated loon, Gavia stellata

American white pelican, Pelecanus erythrorhynchos
Double-crested cormorant, Phalacrocorax auritus
American bittern, Botaurus lentiginosus
Osprey, Pandion haliaetus
Bald eagle, Haliaeetus leucocephalus
Northern harrier, Circus cyaneus
Sharp-shinned hawk, Accipiter striatus
Broad-winged hawk, Buteo platypterus
Swainson's hawk, Buteo swainsoni
Red-tailed hawk, Buteo jamaicensis
Rough-legged hawk, Buteo lagopus
Golden eagle, Aquila chrysaetos
Gyrfalcon, Falco rusticolus
Sandhill crane, Grus canadensis
Pacific golden-plover, Pluvialis fulva
American golden-plover, Pluvialis dominica
Piping plover, Charadrius melodus
Rock sandpiper, Calidris ptilocnemis
Western sandpiper, Calidris mauri
Baird's sandpiper, Calidris bairdii
Semipalmated sandpiper, Calidris pusilla
Dunlin, Calidris alpina

Stilt sandpiper, Calidris himantopus
Long-billed dowitcher, Limnodromus scolopaceus
American woodcock, Scolopax minor
Wilson's phalarope, Phalaropus tricolor
Franklin's gull, Leucophaeus pipixcan
Ring-billed gull, Larus delawarensis
Black tern, Chlidonias niger
Long-tailed jaeger, Stercorarius longicaudus
Parasitic jaeger, Stercorarius parasiticus
Black-billed cuckoo, Coccyzus erythropthalmus
Great horned owl, Bubo virginianus
Barred owl, Strix varia

Long-eared owl, Asio otus
Northern saw-whet owl, Aegolius acadicus
Belted kingfisher, Ceryle alcyon
Hairy woodpecker, Picoides villosus
Northern flicker, Colaptes auratus
Pileated woodpecker, Dryocopus pileatus
Western wood-pewee, Contopus sordidulus
Eastern phoebe, Sayornis phoebe
Eastern kingbird, Tyrannus tyrannus
Warbling vireo, Vireo gilvus
Red-eyed vireo, Vireo olivaceus
Blue jay, Cyanocitta cristata
Black-billed magpie, Pica hudsonia
American crow, Corvus brachyrhynchos
Common raven, Corvus corax
Horned lark, Eremophila alpestris
Tree swallow, Tachycineta bicolor
Bank swallow, Riparia riparia

Black-capped chickadee, Poecile atricapillus
Red-breasted nuthatch, Sitta canadensis
Brown creeper, Certhia americana
Winter wren, Troglodytes hiemalis
Golden-crowned kinglet, Regulus satrapa
Arctic warbler, Phylloscopus borealis
Veery, Catharus fuscescens
Varied thrush, Ixoreus naevius
American pipit, Anthus rubescens
Sprague's pipit, Anthus spragueii

Townsend's solitaire, Myadestes townsendi
American robin, Turdus migratorius
Cedar waxwing, Bombycilla cedrorum
Yellow warbler, Setophaga petechia
Black-throated blue warbler, Setophaga caerulescens
Common yellowthroat, Geothlypis trichas
American redstart, Setophaga ruticilla
Chipping sparrow, Spizella passerina
Nelson's sparrow, Ammodramus nelsoni
Savannah sparrow, Passerculus sandwichensis
Song sparrow, Melospiza melodia
Smith's longspur, Calcarius pictus
Lapland longspur, Calcarius lapponicus
Snow bunting, Plectrophenax nivalis

Rose-breasted grosbeak, Pheucticus ludovicianus
Common grackle, Quiscalus quiscula
Purple finch Haemorhous purpureus
Pine siskin, Spinus pinus
Hoary redpoll, Acanthis hornemanni
Evening grosbeak, Hesperiphona vespertina

Birds that are minimally dependent on boreal forests
These are birds usually at their fringe of their ranges in the boreal forest or that occur less frequently as breeders in the boreal forest because their ideal habitat is not included in the taiga.
Ross's goose, Chen rossii
Wood duck, Aix sponsa
Gadwall, Anas strepera

Blue-winged teal Anas discors
Cinnamon teal, Anas cyanoptera
Redhead, Aythya americana
Ruddy duck, Oxyura jamaicensis
Yellow-billed loon, Gavia adamsii
Pied-billed grebe Podilymbus podiceps
Eared grebe, Podiceps nigricollis
Western grebe, Aechmophorus occidentalis
Great blue heron, Ardea herodias
Green heron, Butorides virescens
Black-crowned night-heron, Nycticorax nycticorax
Turkey vulture, Cathartes aura
Tundra swan, Cygnus columbianus
Cooper's hawk, Accipiter cooperii
American kestrel, Falco sparverius

Peregrine falcon, Falco peregrinus
Sharp-tailed grouse, Tympanuchus phasianellus
Gray partridge, Perdix perdix
Ring-necked pheasant, Phasianus colchicus
Wild turkey, Meleagris gallopavo
Virginia rail, Rallus limicola
American coot, Fulica americana
Black-bellied plover, Pluvialis squatarola
Killdeer, Charadrius vociferus
American avocet, Recurvirostra americana
Willet, Tringa semipalmata
Upland sandpiper, Bartramia longicauda
Marbled godwit, Limosa fedoa
Bar-tailed godwit, Limosa lapponica
Bristle-thighed curlew, Numenius tahitiensis
Long-billed curlew, Numenius americanus
Ruddy turnstone, Arenaria interpres
Black turnstone, Arenaria melanocephala
Buff-breasted sandpiper, Tryngites subruficollis
Red phalarope, Phalaropus fulicaria

California gull, Larus californicus
Glaucous-winged gull, Larus glaucescens
Glaucous gull, Larus hyperboreus
Sabine's gull, Xema sabini
Caspian tern, Hydroprogne caspia
Forster's tern, Sterna forsteri
Rock pigeon, Columba livia
Mourning dove, Zenaida macroura
Eastern screech-owl, Megascops asio
Snowy owl, Nyctea scandiaca
Northern pygmy-owl, Glaucidium gnoma
Short-eared owl, Asio flammeus
Common nighthawk, Chordeiles minor
Whip-poor-will, Caprimulgus vociferus
Chimney swift, Chaetura pelagica
Ruby-throated hummingbird, Archilochus colubris
Rufous hummingbird, Selasphorus rufus
Red-naped sapsucker, Sphyrapicus nuchalis
Red-breasted sapsucker, Sphyrapicus ruber

Downy woodpecker, Picoides pubescens
Eastern wood-pewee, Contopus virens
Willow flycatcher, Empidonax traillii
Hammond's flycatcher, Empidonax hammondii
Dusky flycatcher, Empidonax oberholseri
Cordilleran flycatcher, Empidonax occidentalis
Say's phoebe, Sayornis saya
Great crested flycatcher, Myiarchus crinitus
Western kingbird, Tyrannus verticalis
Yellow-throated vireo, Vireo flavifrons
Cassin's vireo, Vireo cassinii
Steller's jay, Cyanocitta stelleri
Clark's nutcracker, Nucifraga columbiana
Purple martin, Progne subis
Violet-green swallow, Tachycineta thalassina
Cliff swallow, Petrochelidon pyrrhonota
Barn swallow, Hirundo rustica
Mountain chickadee, Poecile gambeli
Chestnut-backed chickadee, Poecile rufescens
White-breasted nuthatch, Sitta carolinensis
House wren, Troglodytes aedon
Sedge wren, Cistothorus platensis
Marsh wren, Cistothorus palustris
American dipper, Cinclus mexicanus

Red-throated pipit, Anthus cervinus
Yellow wagtail, Motacilla flava
Bluethroat, Luscinia svecica
Eastern bluebird, Sialia sialis
Mountain bluebird, Sialia currucoides
Wood thrush, Hylocichla mustelina
Gray catbird, Dumetella carolinensis
Brown thrasher, Toxostoma rufum
European starling, Sturnus vulgaris
Golden-winged warbler, Vermivora chrysoptera
Northern parula, Setophaga americana
Townsend's warbler, Setophaga townsendi
Pine warbler, Setophaga pinus
Prairie warbler, Setophaga discolor
MacGillivray's warbler, Geothlypis tolmiei
Scarlet tanager, Piranga olivacea
Western tanager, Piranga ludoviciana
Spotted towhee, Pipilo maculatus
Eastern towhee, Pipilo erythrophthalmus
Brewer's sparrow, Spizella breweri
Lark sparrow, Chondestes grammacus
Vesper sparrow Pooecetes gramineus
Baird's sparrow, Ammodramus bairdii
Grasshopper sparrow, Ammodramus savannarum
Harris's sparrow, Zonotrichia querula
Northern cardinal, Cardinalis cardinalis
Indigo bunting, Passerina cyanea
Bobolink, Dolichonyx oryzivorus
Red-winged blackbird, Agelaius phoeniceus
Eastern meadowlark, Sturnella magna
Western meadowlark, Sturnella neglecta

Brewer's blackbird, Euphagus cyanocephalus
Yellow-headed blackbird, Xanthocephalus xanthocephalus
Brown-headed cowbird, Molothrus ater
Baltimore oriole, Icterus galbula
Cassin's finch, Carpodacus cassinii
House finch, Carpodacus mexicanus
American goldfinch, Spinus tristis
House sparrow, Passer domesticus

See also
Taiga
Boreal Forest Conservation Framework
Success of fire suppression in northern forests
List of North American birds

External links
Boreal Songbird Initiative

Boreal forests
Birds
Taiga and boreal forests